Saar Klein (born 1967) is an Israeli-American film editor and director, who has been nominated for two Academy Awards for Best Film Editing for The Thin Red Line and for Almost Famous, and who received an ACE Eddie Award for editing the latter one.

Early life
Klein was born in Jerusalem, Israel, to a family of Jewish descent. He immigrated to the United States with his parents at the age of 9. In 1989, Klein received a bachelor's degree in psychology from Vassar College in Poughkeepsie, New York.

Career
Klein was offered an internship with editor Joe Hutshing on the film JFK (directed by Oliver Stone-1991); his first editing credit (as an apprentice to editors David Brenner and Sally Menke) was for the 1993 film Heaven & Earth (directed by Oliver Stone). The Thin Red Line, which was nominated for an editing Academy Award, was only his second credit as an editor. Klein shared this credit with Leslie Jones and Billy Weber; the film was directed by Terrence Malick. Klein and Joe Hutshing co-edited Almost Famous (2000), which was directed by Cameron Crowe.

Klein edited The Bourne Identity (directed by Doug Liman - 2002), which was the first in the series of films based on the novels of Robert Ludlum. Christopher Rouse, who worked as an additional editor on The Bourne Identity, edited the subsequent films that were directed by Paul Greengrass. Klein subsequently co-edited The New World (2005) (again with director Terrence Malick); Malick's films have typically used several editors. Klein recently edited Jumper (2008) (with director Doug Liman).

Klein has written and directed two short films, Nouveau Riche No. 11 and Nouveau Riche No. 34, which have been shown at several film festivals.

His directorial debut film Things People Do premiered in the Panorama section of the 64th Berlin International Film Festival in 2014.

Filmography

Editor
 1995 : P.C.H. (TV Movie)
 1996 : For Which He Stands
 1998 : The Thin Red Line
 1999 : Endurance
 2000 : Almost Famous
 2002 : The Bourne Identity
 2005 : The New World
 2008 : Jumper
 2009 : Fighting
 2014 : After the Fall
 2018 : Burden
 2019 : The Wolf's Call
 2021 : Locked Down

Additional Editor
 1991 : JFK
 1993 : Heaven & Earth
 1994 : The River Wild
 1995 : The Cure
 1997 : U Turn
 1997 : Sub Down
 2006 : The Elephant King
 2008 : Cadillac Records
 2010 : Fair Game
 2011 : Butter
 2017 : American Made

Director / Writer
 2014 : After the Fall

Accolades

References

External links

American film editors
American film directors
Vassar College alumni
Israeli emigrants to the United States
Living people
1967 births
Israeli Jews